Daniel Y. Abebe is an American lawyer and law professor. Abebe is Harold J. and Marion F. Green Professor of Law and Deputy Dean of the University of Chicago Law School and a Vice Provost of the University of Chicago. His research focuses on foreign relations law and public international law.

Education 
Abebe graduated summa cum laude from Maryville University of St. Louis in 1997. He earned a JD from Harvard Law School in 2000, then an MA (2006) and PhD (2013) in political science from the University of Chicago.

Career 
Abebe clerked on the Sixth Circuit for Judge Damon J. Keith, then worked at the law firm Cravath, Swaine & Moore before joining the faculty of the University of Chicago Law School in 2008. He is also affiliated with the University of Chicago political science department.

Bibliography

References

Living people
Year of birth missing (living people)
University of Chicago alumni
University of Chicago Law School faculty
Harvard Law School alumni
Maryville University alumni
African-American lawyers
21st-century African-American people